Zona pellucida sperm-binding protein 4, ZP-4 or avilesine, named after its discoverer Manuel Avilés Sánchez is a protein that in humans is encoded by the ZP4 gene.

Function 

The zona pellucida is an extracellular matrix that surrounds the oocyte and early embryo. It is composed primarily of three or four glycoproteins with various functions during fertilization and preimplantation development. The nascent protein contains a N-terminal signal peptide sequence, a conserved zona pellucida-like domain, a consensus furin cleavage site, and a C-terminal transmembrane domain. It is hypothesized that furin cleavage results in release of the mature protein from the plasma membrane for subsequent incorporation into the zona pellucida matrix. However, the requirement for furin cleavage in this process remains controversial based on mouse studies.

Previously, this gene has been referred to as ZP1 or ZPB and thought to have similar functions as mouse Zp1. However, a human gene with higher similarity and chromosomal synteny to mouse Zp1 has been assigned the symbol ZP1 and this gene has been assigned the symbol ZP4.

References

Further reading